More Protein is a record label started by Boy George and Jeremy Healy in 1989. It was created after finding a label to release the Jeremy Healy produced E-Zee Possee song Everything Starts With an 'E', which attained notoriety through its explicit discussion of drugs, proved impossible.

Acts
Boy George
Jesus Loves You
MC Kinky
Eve Gallagher
Lippy Lou

References

External links
 More Protein at Discogs.com

Record labels established in 1989